Njesuthi or Injesuthi Dome is one of the highest mountains in the Drakensberg mountain range at . It is located on the border between Lesotho and the South African province KwaZulu-Natal.

See also 
 List of mountains in South Africa

External links
 South Africa Tours and Travel: Geography of South Africa
 Oxford Business Group: South Africa: Country Profile - Geography, History, Government and Politics

Drakensberg
Mountains of Lesotho
International mountains of Africa
Lesotho–South Africa border
Mountains of KwaZulu-Natal